is the railway station in Kami-Motoyama-cho, Sasebo City, Nagasaki Prefecture. It is operated by Matsuura Railway and is on the Nishi-Kyūshū Line.

Lines 
Matsuura Railway
Nishi-Kyūshū Line

Adjacent stations

Station layout
Nakazato Station has one ground level island platform serving two tracks.

Environs
National Route 204
Hinokidai Danchi

History
March 27, 1920 - Opens for business by Sasebo Railway as Nakazato Station.
April 1, 1987 - Railways privatize and this station is inherited by JR Kyushu.
April 1, 1988 - This station is inherited by Matsuura Railway and Renamed to present name.

References
Nagasaki statistical yearbook (Nagasaki prefectural office statistics section,Japanese)

External links
Matsuura Railway (Japanese)

Railway stations in Japan opened in 1920
Railway stations in Nagasaki Prefecture
Sasebo